Liolaemus meraxes is a species of lizard in the family Iguanidae.  It is found in Argentina.

References

meraxes
Lizards of South America
Reptiles of Argentina
Endemic fauna of Argentina
Reptiles described in 2019
Taxa named by Andrés Sebastián Quinteros
Taxa named by Cristian Simón Abdala